The 9th Indian Infantry Brigade was an infantry brigade formation of the Indian Army during World War II. Before the war the 9th (Jhansi) Infantry Brigade was a peacetime formation in Meerut district. This brigade was redesignated the 5th Indian Infantry Brigade and a new 9th Brigade was then formed all in September 1939. The new brigade was assigned to the 5th Indian Infantry Division in June 1940 to January 1944. It then spent February attached to the 7th Indian Infantry Division before returning to the 5th Division. The brigade spent two other short periods away from the 5th Division it was attached to the 17th Indian Infantry Division between March and April 1945 and was with the 19th Indian Infantry Division in April 1945, and returned to the 5th for the rest of the war.

Formation 
1st Battalion, Royal Fusiliers September 1939
25th Field Regiment, Royal Artillery September 1939
3rd Battalion, 1st Punjab Regiment September 1939
4th Battalion, 6th Rajputana Rifles September 1939
3rd Battalion, 12th Frontier Force Regiment September 1939 to June 1942
3rd Battalion, 5th Mahratta Light Infantry January 1940 to May 1942
6th Battalion, 13th Frontier Force Rifles August to October 1940 and December 1940 to January 1941
4th Field Regiment, Royal Artillery September to October 1940 and March to June 1944	
2nd Battalion, West Yorkshire Regiment November 1940 to August 1945	
3rd Battalion, 18th Royal Garhwal Rifles April to May 1941
28th Field Regiment, Royal Artillery October 1941 to March 1942
3rd Battalion, 9th Jat Regiment May 1942 to December 1944
4th Battalion, 10th Baluch Regiment June 1942
3rd Battalion, 14th Punjab Regiment July 1942 to October 1944
1st Battalion, 2nd Punjab Regiment July to August 1942	 
4th Battalion, Jammu and Kashmir Infantry October 1944 to April 1945
3rd Battalion, 2nd Punjab Regiment March to August 1945	
1st Battalion, Burma Regiment April to August 1945
7th Battalion, York and Lancaster Regiment June 1945

See also

 List of Indian Army Brigades in World War II

References

British Indian Army brigades
Brigades of India in World War II
Military units and formations in Burma in World War II